The Taylor Log House and Site is a historic plantation site on Arkanasas Highway 138 in rural Drew County, Arkansas, near the town of Winchester.  Included on the plantation site is the best-preserved dog trot house in Arkansas's Lower Delta region.  The Taylor Log House, a two-story dog trot built out of cypress logs, was built in 1846 by John Martin Taylor, a Kentucky native who established a plantation on the banks of Bayou Bartholomew.  The building was moved, probably in the 1880s.  In addition to the house, the site is believed to include archeologically significant remnants of a wide variety of outbuildings.  The site was the subject of archeological activities in the 1990s.

The site was listed on the National Register of Historic Places in 1995.

See also
National Register of Historic Places listings in Drew County, Arkansas

References

Houses on the National Register of Historic Places in Arkansas
Houses completed in 1846
Houses in Drew County, Arkansas
National Register of Historic Places in Drew County, Arkansas